The 2017 UEFA European Under-19 Championship (also known as UEFA Under-19 Euro 2017) was the 16th edition of the UEFA European Under-19 Championship (66th edition if the Under-18 and Junior eras are included), the annual international youth football championship organised by UEFA for the men's under-19 national teams of Europe. Georgia, which were selected by UEFA on 26 January 2015, hosted the tournament.

A total of eight teams played in the tournament, with players born on or after 1 January 1998 eligible to participate.

In the final, which was played on 15 July, England defeated Portugal 2–1.

Qualification

All 54 UEFA nations entered the competition, and with the hosts Georgia qualifying automatically, the other 53 teams competed in the qualifying competition to determine the remaining seven spots in the final tournament. The qualifying competition consisted of two rounds: Qualifying round, which took place in autumn 2016, and Elite round, which took place in spring 2017.

Qualified teams
The following eight teams qualified for the final tournament.

Note: All appearance statistics include only U-19 era (since 2002).

Final draw
The final draw was held in 13 April 2017, 14:00 GET (UTC+4), at the Ballroom of Hotels & Preference Hualing in Tbilisi, Georgia. The eight teams were drawn into two groups of four teams. There was no seeding, except that hosts Georgia were assigned to position A1 in the draw.

Venues

The final tournament matches were held in four stadium venues located in two cities:

Match officials
A total of 6 referees, 8 assistant referees and 2 fourth officials were appointed for the final tournament.

Referees
 Mads-Kristoffer Kristoffersen
 Davide Massa
 Ole Hobber Nilsen
 Sergey Lapochkin
 Srđan Jovanović
 Ali Palabıyık

Assistant referees
 Denis Rexha
 Yury Khomchanka
 Thibaud Nijssen
 Silver Koiv
 Balázs Buzás
 Daniel Da Costa
 Graeme Stewart
 Igor Alokhin

Fourth officials
 Giorgi Kruashvili
 George Vadachkoria

 Volunteer
 Lazare Erkomaishvili

Squads

Each national team have to submit a squad of 18 players.

Group stage
The final tournament schedule was confirmed on 24 April 2017.

The group winners and runners-up advance to the semi-finals.

Tiebreakers
The teams are ranked according to points (3 points for a win, 1 point for a draw, 0 points for a loss). If two or more teams are equal on points on completion of the group matches, the following tie-breaking criteria are applied, in the order given, to determine the rankings (Regulations Articles 17.01 and 17.02):
Higher number of points obtained in the group matches played among the teams in question;
Superior goal difference resulting from the group matches played among the teams in question;
Higher number of goals scored in the group matches played among the teams in question;
If, after having applied criteria 1 to 3, teams still have an equal ranking, criteria 1 to 3 are reapplied exclusively to the group matches between the teams in question to determine their final rankings. If this procedure does not lead to a decision, criteria 5 to 9 apply;
Superior goal difference in all group matches;
Higher number of goals scored in all group matches;
If only two teams have the same number of points, and they are tied according to criteria 1 to 6 after having met in the last round of the group stage, their rankings are determined by a penalty shoot-out (not used if more than two teams have the same number of points, or if their rankings are not relevant for qualification for the next stage).
Lower disciplinary points total based only on yellow and red cards received in the group matches (red card = 3 points, yellow card = 1 point, expulsion for two yellow cards in one match = 3 points);
Higher position in the coefficient ranking list used for the qualifying round draw;
Drawing of lots.

All times are local, GET (UTC+4).

Group A

Group B

Knockout stage
In the knockout stage, extra time and penalty shoot-out are used to decide the winner if necessary.

On 2 May 2016, the UEFA Executive Committee agreed that the competition would be part of the International Football Association Board (IFAB)'s trial to allow a fourth substitute to be made during extra time. On 1 June 2017, it was also announced as part of a trial sanctioned by the IFAB to reduce the advantage of the team shooting first in a penalty shoot-out, a different sequence of taking penalties, known as "ABBA", that mirrors the serving sequence in a tennis tiebreak would be used if a penalty shoot-out was needed (team A kicks first, team B kicks second):
Original sequence
AB AB AB AB AB (sudden death starts) AB AB etc.
Trial sequence
AB BA AB BA AB (sudden death starts) BA AB etc.

Bracket

Semi-finals

Final

Goalscorers
3 goals

 Ben Brereton
 Ryan Sessegnon
 Joël Piroe
 Viktor Gyökeres

2 goals

 Daniel Turyna
 Lukas Nmecha
 Rui Pedro

1 goal

 Georgi Rusev 
 Martin Graiciar
 Libor Holík
 Ondřej Šašinka
 Mason Mount
 Easah Suliman
 Giorgi Chakvetadze
 Giorgi Kokhreidze
 Etienne Amenyido
 Aymen Barkok
 Sidney Friede
 Gökhan Gül
 Tobias Warschewski
 Jay-Roy Grot
 Rodney Kongolo
 Mesaque Djú
 Gedson Fernandes
 João Filipe
 Rafael Leão
 Jesper Karlsson

1 own goal

 Dujon Sterling (playing against Portugal)

Team of the Tournament

Goalkeepers
 Justin Bijlow
 Diogo Costa

Defenders
 Alex Král
 Dujon Sterling
 Abdu Conté
 Diogo Dalot
 Diogo Queirós

Midfielders
 Ondřej Šašinka
 Tayo Edun
 Mason Mount
 Giorgi Kutsia
 Rui Pires

Forwards
 Ryan Sessegnon
 Giorgi Chakvetadze
 Javairô Dilrosun
 Mesaque Djú
 Rui Pedro
 Viktor Gyökeres

References

External links

2016/17 final tournament: Georgia, UEFA.com

 
2017
Under-19 Championship
2017 Uefa European Under-19 Championship
2017 in Georgian football
July 2017 sports events in Europe
2017 in youth association football